Comptus maculatus, the Cayman galliwasp, is a species of lizard of the Diploglossidae family endemic to the Cayman Islands.

Taxonomy
It was formerly classified in the genus Celestus, but was moved to Comptus in 2021.

References

Comptus
Reptiles described in 1888
Reptiles of the Cayman Islands
Endemic fauna of the Cayman Islands
Taxa named by Samuel Garman